The first world record in the 200 metres individual medley in long course (50 metres) swimming was recognised by the International Swimming Federation (FINA) in 1956, followed by the women a year later. In the short course (25 metres) swimming events the world's governing body recognizes world records since March 3, 1991.

Men

Long course

Short course

Women

Long course

Short course

All-time top 25

Men long course
Correct as of July 2022

Notes
Below is a list of other times equal or superior to 1:56.99:
Ryan Lochte also swam 1:54.10 (2009), 1:54.43 (2010), 1:54.56 (2009), 1:54.84 (2010), 1:54.90 (2012), 1:54.93 (2012), 1:54.98 (2013), 1:55.18 (2009), 1:55.22 (2008), 1:55.44 (2013), 1:55.51 (2012), 1:55.81 (2015), 1:56.02 (2014), 1:56.11 (2006), 1:56.13 (2012), 1:56.19 (2007), 1:56.22 (2016), 1:56.28 (2016), 1:56.50 (2014), 1:56.53 (2008), 1:56.71 (2016), 1:56.74 (2011), 1:56.78 (2006), 1:56.81 (2015), 1:56.95 (2007).
Michael Phelps also swam 1:54.23 (2008), 1:54.27 (2012), 1:54.66 (2016), 1:54.75 (2015), 1:54.80 (2008), 1:54.84 (2012), 1:54.98 (2007), 1:55.78 (2016), 1:55.84 (2006), 1:55.91 (2016), 1:55.94 (2003, 2010), 1:56.04 (2003, 2014), 1:56.32 (2012), 1:56.50 (2006), 1:56.55 (2014), 1:56.66 (2012), 1:56.68 (2005), 1:56.71 (2004), 1:56.88 (2011).
László Cseh also swam 1:55.24 (2009), 1:56.22 (2012), 1:56.34 (2009), 1:56.52 (2008), 1:56.66 (2012), 1:56.74 (2012), 1:56.92 (2007).
Kosuke Hagino also swam 1:55.33 (2014), 1:55.34 (2014), 1:55.38 (2014), 1:55.74 (2013), 1:55.90 (2014), 1:55.98 (2016), 1:56.01 (2017, 2017), 1:56.02 (2014), 1:56.04 (2017), 1:56.13 (2016), 1:56.29 (2013), 1:56.30 (2015, 2017), 1:56.37 (2018), 1:56.46 (2017), 1:56.61 (2016), 1:56.66 (2018), 1:56.75 (2018), 1:56.82 (2015).
Michael Andrew also swam 1:55.44 (2021), 1:56.25 (2021), 1:56.40 (2021), 1:56.83 (2020), 1:56.84 (2021).
Chase Kalisz also swam 1:55.56 (2017), 1:55.73 (2018), 1:55.88 (2017), 1:56.21 (2022), 1:56.43 (2022), 1:56.48 (2017), 1:56.51 (2017), 1:56.52 (2022), 1:56.76 (2022), 1:56.78 (2019), 1:56.97 (2021).
Leon Marchand also swam 1:55.75 (2022), 1:56.95 (2022).
Duncan Scott also swam 1:55.90 (2021), 1:56.08 (2022), 1:56.65 (2019), 1:56.69 (2021), 1:56.88 (2022), 1:56.91 (2019).
Eric Shanteau also swam 1:56.00 (2009).
Daiya Seto also swam 1:56.14 (2019), 1:56.22 (2021, 2022), 1:56.27 (2022), 1:56.69 (2019), 1:56.72 (2023), 1:56.74 (2022), 1:56.82 (2015), 1:56.85 (2018), 1:56.86 (2021), 1:56.90 (2016), 1:56.92 (2017), 1:56.97 (2017), 1:56.98 (2019).
Wang Shun also swam 1:56.16 (2017), 1:56.22 (2021), 1:56.27 (2020), 1:56.28 (2017), 1:56.33 (2021), 1:56.52 (2018), 1:56.57 (2018), 1:56.66 (2016, 2019), 1:56.78 (2021), 1:56.81 (2015, 2020), 1:56.83 (2020), 1:56.86 (2013), 1:56.97 (2019).
Mitch Larkin also swam 1:56.21 (2018), 1:56.29 (2021), 1:56.32 (2020), 1:56.74 (2021), 1:56.83 (2019).
Thiago Pereira also swam 1:56.30 (2013), 1:56.65 (2015), 1:56.74 (2012).
Carson Foster also swam 1:56.44 (2022), 1:56.65 (2022).
Jérémy Desplanches also swam 1:56.56 (2019), 1:56.73 (2019), 1:56.86 (2017), 1:56.89 (2019, 2021), 1:56.95 (2021).
Philip Heintz also swam 1:56.59 (2017), 1:56.67 (2018), 1:56.86 (2019), 1:56.95 (2019).
Max Litchfield also swam 1:56.70 (2017), 1:56.86 (2017).
Shaine Casas also swam 1:56.70 (2022).
Leith Brodie also swam 1:56.75 (2009).
Hugo González also swam 1:56.76 (2021).

Men short course
Correct as of December 2022

Notes
Below is a list of other times equal or superior to 1:52.16:
Ryan Lochte also swam 1:50.08 (2010), 1:51.31 (2014), 1:51.56 (2008).
Daiya Seto also swam 1:50.76 (2019), 1:51.09 (2018), 1:51.12 (2021), 1:51.15 (2021), 1:51.39 (2022), 1:51.40 (2017), 1:51.76 (2022), 1:51.79 (2014), 1:51.80 (2021), 1:51.88 (2017).
Andreas Vazaios also swam 1:51.15 (2021), 1:51.84 (2020), 1:51.94 (2021).
Kosuke Hagino also swam 1:51.27 (2014), 1:51.50 (2013).
Shaine Casas also swam 1:51.31 (2022).
Carson Foster also swam 1:51.35 (2021), 1:51.89 (2022).
Shun Wang also swam 1:51.45 (2018), 1:51.63 (2016), 1:51.74 (2016), 1:51.84 (2018), 1:52.08 (2018).
Matthew Sates also swam 1:51.45 (2021).
Duncan Scott also swam 1:51.66 (2020), 1:51.85 (2019), 1:51.96 (2020).
Darian Townsend also swam 1:51.79 (2009).
Philip Heintz also swam 1:52.03 (2016), 1:52.07 (2016), 1:52.08 (2016).
Alberto Razzetti also swam 1:51.73 (2022), 1:52.10 (2021).
Chad le Clos also swam 1:52.11 (2013).

Women long course
Correct as of March 2023

Notes
Below is a list of other times equal or superior to 2:09.34:
Katinka Hosszú also swam 2:06.58 (2016), 2:06.84 (2015), 2:07.00 (2017), 2:07.02 (2019), 2:07.14 (2017), 2:07.17 (2019), 2:07.30 (2015, 2016), 2:07.45 (2016), 2:07.46 (2009), 2:07.49 (2017), 2:07.53 (2019), 2:07.69 (2016), 2:07.92 (2013, 2016), 2:08.11 (2014), 2:08.13 (2016), 2:08.15 (2019), 2:08.20 (2016), 2:08.28 (2019), 2:08.41 (2014), 2:08.45 (2013), 2:08.49 (2017), 2:08.50 (2019), 2:08.55 (2019), 2:08.57 (2019), 2:08.59 (2013), 2:08.60 (2016), 2:08.61 (2015), 2:08.63 (2019, 2019), 2:08.66 (2015), 2:08.72 (2019), 2:08.77 (2015), 2:08.81 (2019), 2:08.93 (2016, 2016), 2:09.01 (2019), 2:09.07 (2019), 2:09.11 (2016), 2:09.12 (2009), 2:09.19 (2015, 2019).
Ariana Kukors also swam 2:07.03 (2009), 2:08.53 (2009), 2:09.12 (2011).
Siobhan-Marie O'Connor also swam 2:07.57 (2016), 2:08.21 (2014), 2:08.44 (2016), 2:08.45 (2015), 2:08.77 (2015), 2:08.82 (2015), 2:09.03 (2016).
Alex Walsh also swam 2:07.84 (2022), 2:08.65 (2021), 2:08.74 (2022), 2:08.87 (2021), 2:09.01 (2019), 2:09.30 (2021).
Yui Ohashi also swam 2:08.16 (2018), 2:08.52 (2021), 2:08.80 (2019), 2:08.88 (2018), 2:08.92 (2018), 2:09.00 (2019), 2:09.14 (2019), 2:09.17 (2018), 2:09.27 (2019).
Kaylee McKeown also swam 2:08.23 (2020), 2:08.27 (2023), 2:08.57 (2022), 2:08.73 (2021), 2:09.15 (2022).
Ye Shiwen also swam 2:08.39 (2012), 2:08.60 (2019), 2:08.90 (2011, 2012), 2:08.94 (2014), 2:09.08 (2013), 2:09.12 (2013), 2:09.24 (2019), 2:09.33 (2016).
Stephanie Rice also swam 2:08.45 (2008), 2:08.68 (2009), 2:08.92 (2008).
Kim Seo-yeong also swam 2:08.61 (2018).
Alicia Coutts also swam 2:08.63 (2013), 2:08.89 (2014), 2:09.00 (2011).
Sydney Pickrem also swam 2:08.70 (2019), 2:08.71 (2019), 2:08.83 (2019), 2:09.07 (2018), 2:09.17 (2017), 2:09.24 (2021), 2:09.26 (2020).
Summer McIntosh also swam 2:08.70 (2022).
Kathleen Baker also swam 2:08.75 (2020).
Melanie Margalis also swam 2:08.84 (2019), 2:08.91 (2019), 2:09.03 (2020), 2:09.14 (2019), 2:09.21 (2016).
Maya DiRado also swam 2:08.91 (2016), 2:08.99 (2015).
Kirsty Coventry also swam 2:08.94 (2009).
Madisyn Cox also swam 2:09.03 (2020), 2:09.34 (2021).
Kate Douglass also swam 2:09.16 (2021), 2:09.21 (2021), 2:09.32 (2021).
Abbie Wood also swam 2:09.23 (2021), 2:09.24 (2021).
Rika Omoto also swam 2:09.32 (2019).

Women short course
Correct as of December 2022

Notes
Below is a list of other times equal or superior to 2:05.63:
Katinka Hosszú also swam 2:02.13 (2014), 2:02.53 (2015), 2:02.61 (2014), 2:02.90 (2016), 2:03.07 (2014), 2:03.20 (2013), 2:03.25 (2013, 2018), 2:03.60 (2014), 2:03.66 (2015), 2:04.13 (2018), 2:04.16 (2019), 2:04.31 (2013), 2:04.33 (2013), 2:04.37 (2017), 2:04.39 (2013), 2:04.43 (2017), 2:04.52 (2013), 2:04.56 (2016), 2:04.64 (2017), 2:04.65 (2018), 2:04.68 (2019), 2:04.72 (2012), 2:04.76 (2016, 2017), 2:04.79 (2018), 2:04.94 (2017), 2:04.98 (2017), 2:05.00 (2017), 2:05.01 (2017), 2:05.05 (2013), 2:05.06 (2018), 2:05.07 (2013), 2:05.11 (2019), 2:05.18 (2014), 2:05.25 (2018), 2:05.29 (2017, 2017), 2:05.33 (2013, 2016), 2:05.34 (2013), 2:05.39 (2016), 2:05.42 (2018), 2:05.45 (2013), 2:05.57 (2016), 2:05.60 (2016).
Kaylee McKeown also swam 2:03.68 (2020).
Melanie Margalis also swam 2:04.18 (2020), 2:04.32 (2020), 2:04.62 (2018), 2:04.65 (2018), 2;05.18 (2019), 2:05.32 (2019)).
Sydney Pickrem also swam 2:04.29 (2021), 2:04.34 (2019), 2:04.40 (2020), 2:04.59 (2021), 2:04.85 (2019), 2:05.21 (2021)，2:05.22 (2022), 2:05.23 (2022).
Kate Douglass also swam 2:04.24 (2021), 2:04.39 (2022), 2:04.68 (2021).
Yui Ohashi also swam 2:04.86 (2021), 2:05.04 (2020), 2:05.09 (2020), 2:05.10 (2020), 2:05.13 (2020), 2:05.26 (2020), 2:05.29 (2018), 2:05.45 (2021).
Abbie Wood also swam 2:04.94 (2021), 2:05.08 (2021), 2:05.27 (2020), 2:05.36 (2020), 2:05.45 (2021), 2:05.56 (2020), 2:05.63 (2021).
Beata Nelson also swam 2:05.08 (2022).
Anastasia Gorbenko also swam 2:05.17 (2021).
Siobhan O'Connor also swam 2:05.19 (2015).
Mary-Sophie Harvey also swam 2:05.30 (2021).
Kayla Sanchez also swam 2:05.32 (2019).

References
 Zwemkroniek
 Agenda Diana

Individual medley 200 metres
World record progression 200 metres individual medley